Jaume March (1334/1335–1410) was a Valencian language poet.

Brother of Pere March and uncle of Arnau March and the renowned Ausiàs March, Jaume's family had been lawyers and officers of the court of the king of Aragon. Born in Valencia he was seemingly the eldest son, and inherited the family's possessions around Barcelona. He was knighted by King Peter the Ceremonious and in 1393 was charged with the direction of a poetical institute—the Consistory of Barcelona—founded by King John.

References
  Pujol Gomez, Josep, "March, Jaume" in Gauvard, C., de Libera, A. & Zink, M. (eds), Dictionnaire du Moyen Âge. Paris: PUF/Quadrige, 2nd edn, 2004. 

1330s births
1410 deaths
Catalan-language poets
Medieval Catalan-language writers
14th-century people from the Kingdom of Aragon